2018–19 Syed Mushtaq Ali Trophy was the eleventh edition of Syed Mushtaq Ali Trophy, a Twenty20 competition in India. It took place between 21 February and 14 March 2019. Delhi were the defending champions.

The tournament had five groups, with three groups containing seven teams and two groups with eight teams. The top two teams in each group qualified for the Super League section of the tournament, with the teams split into two further groups of five teams. The top two teams, one from each of the Super League groups, progressed to the final.

In the opening round fixture between Mumbai and Sikkim, Mumbai's Shreyas Iyer scored 147 runs, the highest total by an Indian batsman in a T20 match. The second round saw Andhra beat Nagaland by 179 runs, the biggest winning margin by runs in a Twenty20 cricket match.

Jharkhand and Delhi from Group A, Vidarbha and Gujarat from Group B, Railways and Mumbai from Group C, Karnataka and Bengal from Group D, and Maharashtra and Uttar Pradesh from Group E all progressed to the Super League phase of the tournament.

In the Super League stage of the tournament, Maharashtra won Group A and Karnataka won Group B to advance to the final. With their win in their final Super League match, Karnataka won a total of thirteen consecutive T20 matches, a record for an Indian state team. Karnataka won the tournament, after beating Maharashtra by eight wickets in the final. With the victory, Karnataka equalled the record for a winning streak for an India-based team with fourteen matches, tied with the Kolkata Knight Riders.

League stage

Group A

Group B

Group C

Group D

Group E

Super League

Points table

Group A

Group B

Group A

Group B

Final

References

External links
 Series home at ESPN Cricinfo

2019 in Indian cricket
Domestic cricket competitions in 2018–19